Mesoscia terminata is a moth of the Megalopygidae family. It was described by Schaus in 1905. It is found in Costa Rica and French Guiana.

The wingspan is 27 mm. The forewings are grey, with the costa finely light brown and the apex whitish. The outer margin below vein 7 is broadly light brown, crossed by black veins and fine black streaks between the veins. There is a faint subterminal white shade and a postmedial dentate shade, where the grey and brown meet. The hindwings are black, with the outer margin below the apex creamy white.

References

Moths described in 1905
Megalopygidae